Charles Severance may refer to:
 Charles Severance (computer scientist)
 Charles Severance (serial killer)